Austria's Next Topmodel, season 5 was the fifth season of the Austrian reality documentary based on Tyra Banks America's Next Top Model. Having the entire panel of judges replaced, Austrian-born international fashion model Melanie Scheriau became the new host and was joined by runway-model and former Lagerfeld-muse Carmen Kreuzer, who was also the casting director for the season, and Rolf Scheider, who was already a judge during the third and fourth season of Germany's Next Topmodel.

The show kicked off on January 3, 2013 with the lowest ratings on the premiere for the history of the show. In difference to other years the casting process was not featured in the premiere episode. Instead the final 20 contestants arrived in a military bootcamp and were then taken to Egypt, where at the end of the first episode, the cast of the top 15 was selected.

The winner of the competition was 18-year-old Greta Uszkai from Vienna. As her prizes, she received a contract with Vienna-based modeling agency Wiener Models, a cover of Austrian Woman magazine, a position as the face of Hervis sportwear, a cruise trip for two courtesy of AIDA Cruises and a SEAT León.

Episodes

Episode 1 
Original airdate: 
Challenge winner/Immune: Charlotte Aichhorn, Iris Mann, Katrin Krinner, Sabrina-Nathalie Reitz, Stefanie Wedam & Vanessa Rolke
Quit: Jennifer Bauderer
Eliminated: Ghofran Rashwan, Lyn Amit & Michelle Jovic
Bottom two: Luca Stemer & Sandra Rauter Leeb
Eliminated: Sandra Rauter Leeb

Episode 2 
Original airdate: 
Challenge winner: Greta Uszkai
Eliminated: Charlotte Rothpletz
Bottom two: Charlotte Aichhorn & Isabelle Sylvie
Eliminated: None

Episode 3 
Original airdate: 
Challenge winner: Iris Mann & Vanessa Rolke
Bottom two: Aleksandra Stankovic & Nadja Sejranic
Eliminated: Nadja Sejranic

Episode 4 
Original airdate: 
Challenge winner: Iris Mann & Stefanie Wedam
Booked for job: Greta Uszkai, Tatjana Catic & Vanessa Rolke
Quit: Tatjana Catic
Eliminated: Sabrina Kastner

Episode 5 
Original airdate:  
Eliminated outside of judging panel: Iris Mann 
Immune: Aleksandra Stankovic & Katrin Krinner 
Challenge winner: None 
Booked for job: Aleksandra Stankovic, Luca Stemer & Sabrina-Nathalie Reitz
Eliminated: Sina Lisa Petru

Episode 6 
Original airdate: 
Challenge winner: None
Booked for job: Aleksandra Stankovic
Eliminated: Sabrina-Nathalie Reitz

Episode 7 
Original airdate: 
Challenge winner: None
Booked for job: Katrin Krinner & Charlotte Aichhorn 
Bottom two: Luca Stemer & Vanessa Rolke
Eliminated: Luca Stemer

Episode 8 
Original airdate: 
Challenge winner: Aleksandra Stankovic
Booked for job: Stefanie Wedam
Eliminated: Vanessa Rolke

Episode 9 
Original airdate: 
Challenge winner: Greta Uszkai
Booked for job: Aleksandra Stankovic
Eliminated: Isabelle Sylvie
Bottom two: Charlotte Aichhorn & Stefanie Wedam
Eliminated: Charlotte Aichhorn

Episode 10 
Original airdate: 
Final four: Aleksandra Stankovic, Greta Uszkai, Katrin Krinner & Stefanie Wedam
First eliminated: Stefanie Wedam
Finale three: Aleksandra Stankovic, Greta Uszkai & Katrin Krinner
Second eliminated: Aleksandra Stankovic
Finale two: Greta Uszkai & Katrin Krinner
Austria's next topmodel: Greta Uszkai

Contestants
(ages stated are at start of contest)

Summaries

Results table

 The contestant quit the competition
 The contestant was eliminated outside of judging panel
 The contestant was immune from elimination
 The contestant was in danger of elimination
 The contestant was eliminated
 The contestant won the competition

Photo shoot guide
Episode 1 photo shoot: Recreating H&Ms swimwear campaign
Episode 2 photo shoot: Nomads posing with a camel 
Episode 3 photo shoot: Recreating Rich Proseccos campaign with Paris Hilton 
Episode 4 photo shoot: Recreating Louis Vittons campaign with Marc Jacobs and Naomi Campbell 
Episode 5 photo shoot: Recreating Jimmy Choo's 2012 handbag campaign
Episode 6 photo shoot: Recreating Vöslauer's underwater campaign
Episode 7 photo shoot: Recreating Louis Vitton's campaign with Madonna 
Episode 8 photo shoot: Recreating a topless ''Calvin Klein campaign 
Episode 10 photo shoots: Golden beauty shots; swimwear in the beach

Judges
Melanie Scheriau (Host)
Carmen Kreuzer
Rolf Scheider

References

External links
 Official website

Austria's Next Topmodel
2010s Austrian television series
2013 Austrian television seasons
German-language television shows
Television shows filmed in Austria
Television shows filmed in Egypt